Air Ceylon was the former flag carrier airline of Ceylon (now Sri Lanka). The airline discontinued flights to Europe in early 1978 and finally ceased all local services on 31 August 1979, when it was replaced by Air Lanka and then rebranded to SriLankan Airlines later.

History 

Air Ceylon was established in 1947 as state-owned flag carrier airline. In 1947, the government purchased three DC-3s, which were named after queens Sita Devi, Viharamaha Devi, and Sunethra Devi. 

On 10 December 1947, with Captain Peter Fernando at the controls and a complement of 16 passengers, Sita Devi took off from Ratmalana runway soon after 8 am, inaugurating the Air Ceylon commercial flights, and headed for Palaly. After a brief stop there, the Dakota proceeded to Madras, returning to Colombo by the same route later that day.

Madras-Jaffna-Trichinopoly Douglas C-47 Skytrain services to London with two Douglas DC-4s leased from Australian National Airways (ANA) commenced in summer 1949, after ANA acquired a 49% stake in Air Ceylon earlier that year. Flights to Sydney in co-operation with ANA were started on 20 July 1950 via Singapore and Darwin.

In 1949, Australian National Airways (ANA) owned a 49% stake in Sri Lanka's countrywide service. Air Ceylon discontinued all long-haul fights and gave up its partnership with ANA in September 1953 after BOAC had introduced the de Havilland Comet between London and Colombo. The 49 percent stake held by ANA was taken over by KLM in 1955. In 1960s KLM's shareholding reduced to 25%.

Flights to London were commenced again on 21 February 1956 using a Lockheed 749A Constellation leased from KLM. The aircraft was replaced by a Lockheed L-1049 Super Constellation in 1958, followed by a KLM Lockheed L-188 Electra that was leased until the partnership with KLM ended in November 1961. A Comet from BOAC allowed the relaunch of flights to London in April 1962. The aircraft was replaced by a leased Vickers VC10 in November 1965.

From 1964, the Hawker Siddeley HS 748 became the aircraft mainly used on Air Ceylon's short-haul routes to Madras and Bombay, along with the Aérospatiale N 262 that was bought in 1967. When Bandaranaike International Airport was completed in 1967, Air Ceylon opened its hub there. A Hawker Siddeley Trident jet airliner was purchased in 1969, and it was operated on regional routes until it was withdrawn in August 1979.

In 1972, Union de Transports Aériens (UTA) became Air Ceylon's partner, selling one Douglas DC-8 to the airline and giving technical support. UTA ended the partnership in September 1976, leaving Air Ceylon without a European aide. In 1979, Air Ceylon was shut down by the Sri Lankan government due to bankruptcy, and Air Lanka was established as new national carrier.

During that period, Air Ceylon offered multiple-stopover flights, which were leaving Colombo on three routes - to Europe, to Australia, and a regional one to India. KLM was the important partner airline, serving as general sales agent for Air Ceylon.

Due to more modern aircraft with a longer range, fewer stops were required on the long-distance routes, reducing travel time. Air Ceylon passengers could reach additional destinations (in Europe and towards Australia) with co-operative BOAC or Qantas flights.

The co-operation with BOAC and Qantas was reduced at that time, instead a codeshare-like agreement was signed with Indian Airlines. As a consequence, Air Ceylon relaunched services to Australia and expanded its European network.

Terminated destinations

Fleet
Before ending operations in 1979, Air Ceylon had one Hawker Siddeley HS 748 and one Hawker Siddeley Trident.

Over the years, Air Ceylon operated these aircraft types:

Accidents and incidents
On 21 December 1949, an Air Ceylon Douglas C-47 Dakota (registered VP-CAT) was damaged beyond repair in a crash landing at Tiruchirapalli Airport following a scheduled passenger flight from Jaffna. The 21 passengers and three crew members survived the accident.
On 7 September 1978, an Air Ceylon Hawker Siddeley HS 748 (registered 4R-ACJ) was destroyed by a on-board bomb and subsequent fire while parked at Ratmalana Airport. Two pilots had been carrying out predeparture checkups.

References

External links 

Defunct airlines of Sri Lanka
Airlines established in 1947
Airlines disestablished in 1979
1947 establishments in Ceylon